Love is an American romantic comedy web television series created by Judd Apatow, Lesley Arfin, and Paul Rust, and starring Gillian Jacobs, Chris Witaske, Rust, and Claudia O'Doherty. Netflix originally ordered two seasons of the show. The first 10-episode season was made available on February 19, 2016, and a 12-episode second season premiered on March 10, 2017. Netflix renewed the series for a third season one month prior to the second-season premiere. The third and final 12-episode season premiered on March 9, 2018.

The series is presented as a "down-to-earth look at dating," exploring male and female perspectives on romantic relationships through the characters Mickey and Gus, played by Jacobs and Rust respectively.

Series overview

Episodes

Season 1 (2016)

Season 2 (2017)

Season 3 (2018) 

Lists of American comedy-drama television series episodes
Lists of American romance television series episodes